Camou-Cihigue is a commune in the Pyrénées-Atlantiques department in south-western France.

It is located in the former province of Soule.

Geography
Neughboring communes:
 Ossas-Suhare, in the north
 Aussurucq, in the north-west
 Alos-Sibas-Abense, in the east
 Alçay-Alçabéhéty-Sunharette, in the south

History
The commune of Camou-Cihigue was formed in 1836, from the merger of the former communes of Camou and Cihigue.

See also
Communes of the Pyrénées-Atlantiques department

References

Communes of Pyrénées-Atlantiques
Pyrénées-Atlantiques communes articles needing translation from French Wikipedia